Vadim Davidovich (born 19 September 1996) is an Israeli ice dancer. With his skating partner, Shira Ichilov, he is the 2019 Israeli national champion and has competed in the final segment at two ISU Championships.

Career

Early years 
Davidovich started learning to skate in 2003. Early in his career, he represented Belarus with Hanna Karastsialiova (Karastseleva) and with Russia's Anastasia Tkacheva. Tkacheva/Davidovich appeared at one ISU Junior Grand Prix event, in 2015. The two were coached by Alexander Zhulin and Oleg Volkov in Moscow, Russia.

2016–2017 season 
In July 2016, Davidovich teamed up with Shira Ichilov to compete for Israel, coached by Galit Chait in the United States. In November, making their international debut, Ichilov/Davidovich finished tenth in junior ice dancing at the 2016 Tallinn Trophy. In March, they placed 26th in the short dance at the 2017 World Junior Championships in Taipei, Taiwan. Their placement was not sufficient to advance to the free dance.

2017–2018 season 
In September, Ichilov/Davidovich debuted on the ISU Junior Grand Prix series, finishing sixth in Salzburg, Austria, and then fourth in Riga, Latvia. After taking silver in the junior event at the 2017 Minsk-Arena Ice Star and placing fourth at the 2017 Golden Spin of Zagreb, they became the Israeli national junior champions. In March, the duo competed at the 2018 World Junior Championships in Sofia, Bulgaria; they qualified to the final segment and finished 17th overall. It was Davidovich's final season of age-eligibility for junior events.

2018–2019 season 
Making their senior international debut, Ichilov/Davidovich finished ninth at the 2018 CS Finlandia Trophy in October. They placed 12th at the Volvo Open Cup and 10th at the 2018 CS Golden Spin of Zagreb before taking the Israeli national title.

In January, the two qualified to the free dance at the 2019 European Championships in Minsk, Belarus. They finished 20th overall, having ranked 20th in both segments.

Programs

With Ichilov

With Tkacheva

With Karastsialiova

Competitive highlights 
GP: Grand Prix; CS: Challenger Series; JGP: Junior Grand Prix

With Ichilov for Israel

With Tkacheva for Belarus

With Karastsialiova for Belarus

References

External links 
 

1996 births
Belarusian male ice dancers
Israeli male ice dancers
Living people
Figure skaters from Minsk